Lucie Balthazar (born January 15, 1958 in Saint-Hyacinthe, Quebec) is a Canadian former handball player who competed in the 1976 Summer Olympics.

She was part of the Canadian handball team, which finished sixth in the Olympic tournament. She played all five matches and scored one goal.

References
 profile

1958 births
Canadian female handball players
Handball players at the 1976 Summer Olympics
Living people
Olympic handball players of Canada
Sportspeople from Saint-Hyacinthe